The General Association of Rubber Planters on the East Coast of Sumatra, Dutch: Algemeene Vereeniging van Rubberplanters ter Oostkust van Sumatra (A.V.R.O.S.), was a Dutch agricultural research station organization based near Medan, Sumatra in the Dutch East Indies. A.V.R.O.S. has an office building in Medan and a research station in "Kampong Baroe" (Baru) near Medan. A.V.R.O.S. conducted and published research on commercial plantings.

In 1967, the name changed into BKS-PPS (Badan Kerja Sama Perusahaan Perkebunan Sumatera, Sumatra Plantation Companies Partnership Board).

Gallery

References

History of Sumatra